Throughout the Second Sino-Japanese war (1937–1945),  Japanese dissidents and Japanese prisoners of war (POWs) joined the Chinese in the war against the Empire of Japan.

An IJNAF A5M fighter pilot who was shot down on 26 September 1937, had along with other captured Japanese combatants, become convinced to join the Chinese side, and helped the Chinese break Japanese tactical codes and other information that provided a huge intelligence windfall for the newly-established cryptanalyst unit headed by Dr. Chang Chao-hsi.

The education of Japanese captives by the Eighth Route Army began in 1938. In November 1940 the Peasants' and Workers' School was established. It reeducated Japanese POWs who afterwards were involved in propaganda.

Sanzo Nosaka, and Kaji Wataru joined the Chinese resistance. They reeducated Japanese POWs.
Several organizations emerged during the war. The Anti-War League, the Japanese People's Emancipation League and a communist league.

List of Japanese in the Chinese resistance
Teru Hasegawa
Shigeo Tsutsui
Yuki Ikeda
Kazuo Aoyama

See also
Japanese dissidence during the early Shōwa period

References

Work cited 
 Cheung, Raymond. Osprey Aircraft of the Aces 126: Aces of the Republic of China Air Force. Oxford: Osprey Publishing, 2015. .

Further reading
 

 Xiaoyuan Liu. A Partnership for Disorder: China, the United States, and Their Policies for the Postwar Disposition of the Japanese Empire, 1941-1945.

Japanese Resistance
World War II resistance movements